Four Moments is the debut studio album by the Australian symphonic rock band Sebastian Hardie and was released in August 1975 by Polydor Records. It was their most commercially successful release. The single from the album was the instrumental "Rosanna", which peaked at #55 on the National singles chart. The title track takes up side one of the original vinyl LP release and is a suite of four parts. All tracks were written by lead vocalist / lead guitarist Mario Millo either on his own or with fellow band members Toivo Pilt, Alex Plavsic and Peter Plavsic. The distinctive logo, which would feature on future Sebastian Hardie releases, was designed by Larraine Hall (see infobox at right). The album was produced by former band member Jon English.

Four Moments features dramatic arrangements, seamlessly flowing with its impeccable musicianship displaying influences of European progressive rock bands Genesis, King Crimson, Focus and Yes. Millo, in a 2002 interview, reflected on the creation of the album:

According to Millo: "Glories Shall Be Released" was partly inspired by a boyhood friend's drug experiences - his distorted sense of reality and subsequent suicide, "Rosanna" was named for Millo's older sister who was an emotional support, and "Openings" evolved from the band's jamming.

At the 1975 Australian Record Awards, the album won Best Australian-Designed Cover.

Track listing
Songwriters according to Australasian Performing Right Association (APRA).
 "Four Moments" (Mario Millo, Toivo Pilt, Alex Plavsic, Peter Plavsic) – 20:41
 "Glories Shall Be Released" (Millo) – 6:42
 "Dawn of Our Sun" (Millo) – 5:05
 "Journey Through Our Dreams" (Pilt, A. Plavsic, P. Plavsic, Millo) – 6:43
 "Everything is Real" (Millo) – 2:11
 "Rosanna" (Millo) – 6:02
 "Openings" (Millo, Pilt, A. Plavsic, P. Plavsic) – 13:03
 "Day After Day" (Millo) – 5:18 (Bonus track on Japanese CD Release Avalon MICY-1115 1999)

Personnel
Sebastian Hardie members
 Mario Millo – vocals, lead guitar, mandolin
 Toivo Pilt – keyboards (Hammond organ, piano, Mellotron, Moog)
 Peter Plavsic – bass guitar
 Alex Plavsic – drums, percussion

Additional musicians
 Greg Bushell – congas, bells, tambourine
 Bob Payne – tambourine on "Journey Through Our Dreams"

Recording details
 Arranger: Sebastian Hardie
 Producer: Jon English
 Recording and mixing engineer: Richard Lush at EMI Studios, Sydney

Art work
 Symbol design: Larraine Hall
 Photography: David Miller

Charts

Certifications

References

1975 debut albums